WJST (branded as "Retro FM 102.1") is a radio station serving Albany, Georgia and surrounding cities. This station broadcasts on FM frequency 102.1 MHz and is under ownership of John Golobish, Jr., through licensee JetStream Media LLC.

History
From its official launch in March 1999 through most of 2006, WJST (then WNUQ) was on 101.7 MHz and was known as Q101. The entire time it was broadcasting as "Q101" it did so under a single program director, Jason "J.B." Savage. From 2006 to 2014, the station switched to a Top 40/CHR format and branded itself as "Q102" to coincide with moving to its new frequency at 102.1 MHz.

On August 15, 2014, at 3 PM, the then-WNUQ flipped to country, becoming one of the first "Nash Icon" affiliates as "102.1 Nash Icon".

On March 27, 2018, WNUQ and three other Cumulus stations (KJMO, WPCK, and WTOD) were placed into the Cumulus Reorganization Divestiture Trust for a future sale.

On October 17, 2019, Cumulus announced that WNUQ would be sold to Tripp Morgan's organization, Pretoria Fields Collective Media, for $90,000 from the divestiture trust.

On November 20, it was announced through The Albany Herald that the station would rebrand as "Q102 The Queen Bee" under new callsign WPFQ upon closure of the sale; new station manager Tara Dyer Stoyle reported that the plan was to relaunch the station on January 6, 2020, from new studios at Morgan's Pretoria Fields Brewery in downtown Albany.

On November 26, 2019, The Mainstay Trust closed on the sale for WNUQ from Cumulus Media while changing call letters to WPFQ with a format yet to be disclosed.

The Queen Bee was eventually launched on January 27, 2020, with a AAA format. Stoyle described it as "a culmination of hundreds of hours of selecting and loading thousands of songs that were each hand-picked for the listeners." She also listed additional air staffers as including Kenny Mitchell (formerly of WJAD), Nikki Miller (local dj), Carlton Fletcher (a fellow Albany Herald columnist), as well as members of local bands BoDean & The Poachers and This Solid Ground.

On July 1, 2021, Pretoria Fields Collective Media entered into a Local Marketing Agreement with JetStream Media to operate WPFQ. JetStream took Q102 The Queen Bee off the air on July 1, 2021, to make adjustments to the equipment at the WPFQ tower site. On July 2, 2021, at noon, JetStream Media launched WPFQ as a classic hits station, branded as "Retro FM 102.1" playing hits of the 1980s and 1990s. The first song Retro FM played was "Groove Is in the Heart" by Deee-Lite, the very first song that (now owner) John Golobish, Jr. ever played on the air when his career started at WHJB radio in December 1990. On July 8, 2021, JetStream Media filed an Assignment of Authorization with the FCC to purchase WPFQ from Pretoria Fields Collective Media for $100,000. On December 28, 2021, JetStream Media consummated the purchase of WPFQ and changed the callsign to the current WJST effective January 14, 2022.

On January 1, 2023, WJST dropped the "Hits of the 80s and 90s" branding on 102.1 Retro FM and adopted "Southwest Georgia's Retro Hits," adding music from the early 2000s to its playlist.

Previous logos

References

External links
WJST official website

JST
Classic hits radio stations in the United States
Radio stations established in 2000
2000 establishments in Georgia (U.S. state)